"Starless" is a composition by English progressive rock band King Crimson. It is the final track on their seventh studio album, Red, released on 6 October 1974.

Background 
The original chords and melody for "Starless" were written by John Wetton, who intended the song to be the title track of the group's previous album Starless and Bible Black. Robert Fripp and Bill Bruford initially disliked the song and declined to record it for that album. Instead the group chose an instrumental improvisation as the title track. However, "Starless" was later revived, its lyrics altered and a long instrumental section (based on a bass riff written by Bruford) added to it, and performed live between March and June 1974. For the Red recording sessions, the lyrics were again altered (with contributions by Richard Palmer-James). The introductory theme, originally played by David Cross, was taken over by the guitar, with Fripp making minor alterations to the melody. As the title "Starless and Bible Black" had already been used, the original title was shortened to "Starless".

Composition

The piece is 12 minutes and 18 seconds in length, the longest on the Red album. It starts with mellotron strings, electric guitar and a saxophone. These introduce a vocal segment in conventional verse-chorus structure.

The middle section of the song builds, in 13/4. Starting with John Wetton's bass, shortly after joined by Bill Bruford on percussion. Robert Fripp's guitar repeats a single note theme on two adjacent guitar strings. Bruford's drumming maintains its irregularity.

The song's final section begins with an abrupt transition to a fast, jazzy saxophone solo with distorted guitars and bass, expressive tribal drumming, and the tempo doubling up to a time signature of 13/8. Variations of the middle section's bassline are played under Fripp's layered and overdriven guitar parts. The saxophone returns to play a reprise of the vocal melody, then the final section is repeated with more overdubs from Fripp. Finally, the song ends with a reprise of the opening melody, played on the saxophone instead of the guitar.

Personnel
Robert Fripp – guitar, Mellotron
John Wetton – vocals, bass
Bill Bruford – drums, percussion

with:

Mel Collins – soprano saxophone
Ian McDonald – alto saxophone
Uncredited – double bass, cello

Cover versions
Recorded cover versions of Starless include those by: Neal Morse, Mike Portnoy, and Randy George; Craig Armstrong, on his album As If to Nothing as "Starless II"; Banco de Gaia, on their album Memories Dreams Reflections; The Unthanks, on their 2011 album Last; the Crimson Jazz Trio, on their album King Crimson Songbook Volume One (2005).

The song has been covered live by Asia, a supergroup of which John Wetton was a founding member; 21st Century Schizoid Band, a group made up of earlier members of King Crimson (save for Jakko Jakszyk, who would later join King Crimson); After Crying, a Hungarian symphonic rock band, with guest vocals by Wetton; U.K., one of whose members was once again Wetton; and District 97, yet again featuring vocals from Wetton.

The Canadian band FM performed a live version of "Starless" in concert in 1977 which was captured on reel-to-reel by band member Nash the Slash, shortly after the recording their classic 1st album Black Noise
. It came to light as part of a rarities CD, Lost In Space in 2001. It is a unique cover version as the band consisted of a non-traditional trio; 	Cameron Hawkins (vocals, bass, keyboards/synthesizers, bass pedals), Martin Deller (Drums & Percussion) and Nash the Slash (electric mandolin, electric violin, synthesizers).

In Other Media 
The first part of "Starless" is used in the opening of the film Mandy (2018), starring Nicolas Cage.

References

1970s ballads
King Crimson songs
1974 songs
Rock ballads
Songs written by Bill Bruford
Songs written by Robert Fripp
Songs written by John Wetton
Songs written by Richard Palmer-James
British progressive rock songs